Milliken v. Bradley, 418 U.S. 717 (1974), was a significant United States Supreme Court case dealing with the planned desegregation busing of public school students across district lines among 53 school districts in metropolitan Detroit. It concerned the plans to integrate public schools in the United States following the Brown v. Board of Education (1954) decision.

The ruling clarified the distinction between de jure and de facto segregation, confirming that segregation was allowed if it was not considered an explicit policy of each school district. In particular, the Court held that the school systems were not responsible for desegregation across district lines unless it could be shown that they had each deliberately engaged in a policy of segregation. The case did not expand on Swann v. Charlotte-Mecklenburg Board of Education (1971), the first major Supreme Court case concerning school busing.

Background

Educational segregation in the U.S.
Brown v. Board of Education was a landmark desegregation ruling, but difficult to implement. The case also did not take into account many sources of segregation in the US, including an ongoing migration of Black people into cities, white flight to the suburbs, and policies and practices that barred non-whites from suburban housing. By the 1970s, many urban school districts had super-majorities of black students. Educational segregation was therefore widespread, with informal racial barriers in the form of numerous thinly disguised practices that opposed Black people living in suburbs.

Detroit
Detroit is one of the most segregated cities in the United States. During the Great Migration, the city gained a large black population, which was excluded upon arrival from white neighborhoods. This exclusion was enforced by economic discrimination (redlining), exclusionary clauses in property deeds, as well as violence (destruction of property including arson and bombings, as well as assault). Some of the discriminatory policies in Detroit ended as public awareness increased and became more sensitive to the national civil rights movement, which began after World War II, and as black voting power in city precincts increased. The changes allowed Black people to move into additional neighborhoods in the City, but some neighborhoods resisted and for the most part little or no change of segregative practices occurred in the suburbs.

By the mid-70s, more than two-thirds of students in the Detroit school system were black.

Procedural history
On August 18, 1970, the NAACP filed suit against Michigan state officials, including Governor William Milliken. The original trial began on April 6, 1971, and lasted for 41 days. The NAACP argued that although schools were not officially segregated (white only), the city of Detroit and the State as represented by its surrounding counties had enacted policies to increase racial segregation in schools. The NAACP also suggested a direct relationship between unfair housing practices (such as redlining) and educational segregation.
District Judge Stephen J. Roth initially denied the plaintiffs' motion for a preliminary injunction. 

The Sixth Circuit Court of Appeals ruled that the "implementation of the April 7 plan was [unconstitutionally] thwarted by State action in the form of the Act of the Legislature of Michigan" and remanded the case for an expedited trial on the merits.

On remand to the District Court, Judge Roth held the State of Michigan and the school districts accountable for the segregation, and ordered the implementation of a desegregation plan. 

The Sixth Circuit Court of Appeals affirmed some of the decision, specifically the official segregation that had been practiced by the City's school district, but withheld judgment on the relationship of housing segregation with education. The Court specified that it was the state's responsibility to integrate across the segregated metropolitan area.

The accused officials appealed to the Supreme Court, which took up the case on February 27, 1974.

Decision of the Court
The Supreme Court overturned the lower courts in a 5-to-4 decision, holding that school districts were not obligated to desegregate unless it had been proven that the lines were drawn with racist intent on the part of the districts. Thus, superficially arbitrary lines drawn by State agencies which produced segregated districts were not illegal.

The Court held that "[w]ith no showing of significant violation by the 53 outlying school districts and no evidence of any interdistrict violation or effect," the district court's remedy was "wholly impermissible" and not justified by Brown v. Board of Education. The Court noted that desegregation, "in the sense of dismantling a dual school system," did not require "any particular racial balance in each 'school, grade or classroom.'" The Court agreed that the Constitutional rights of Black people had been violated by the City' school district; the segregative results involving suburban districts did not make suburban districts nor the State of Michigan responsible.

The Court also emphasized the importance of local control over the operation of schools.

Dissents
Justice Thurgood Marshall's dissenting opinion stated that:

School district lines, however innocently drawn, will surely be perceived as fences to separate the races when, under a Detroit-only decree, white parents withdraw their children from the Detroit city schools and move to the suburbs in order to continue them in all-white schools.

Justice Douglas' dissenting opinion stated that:

Today's decision ... means that there is no violation of the Equal Protection Clause though the schools are segregated by race and though the black schools are not only "separate" but "inferior."... Michigan by one device or another has over the years created black school districts and white school districts, the task of equity is to provide a unitary system for the affected area where, as here, the State washes its hands of its own creations.

Impact of the case
The Supreme Court's decision required the City of Detroit's school district to redistribute the relatively small number of white students more widely across the district. According to Wayne State professor John Mogk, the decision also enabled the white flight that re-entrenched the city's segregation. The Detroit Public Schools became even more disproportionately black over the next two decades (with 90% black students in 1987).

This result reaffirmed the national pattern of city schools attended mostly by Black people, with surrounding suburban schools mostly attended by Whites.

See also
List of United States Supreme Court cases, volume 418
Educational inequality in Southeast Michigan

References

External links
 
 

United States equal protection case law
Post–civil rights era in African-American history
African-American history in Detroit
United States school desegregation case law
1974 in United States case law
1974 in Michigan
Detroit Public Schools Community District
Legal history of Michigan
United States Supreme Court cases of the Burger Court
Metro Detroit
United States Supreme Court cases